Aberdeen F.C. is a Scottish professional football club based in Aberdeen, Scotland. The club was founded in 1903 after an amalgamation of three local clubs; Orion F.C., Victoria United and the original Aberdeen FC. The club has played at Pittodrie Stadium since 1903. They are one of the most successful clubs in Scotland, having won four League championships and thirteen domestic trophies, as well as the European Cup Winners' Cup and UEFA Super Cup in 1983.

More than 200 players have made at least 100 appearances (including substitute appearances); those players are listed here. Other players who have made fewer appearances are also included where they are regarded as having played a significant role for the club, with the reason for their inclusion indicated in the Notes column. The club's record appearance maker is Willie Miller, who played 797 games for Aberdeen between 1972 and his retirement in 1990. Joe Harper is the club's top goalscorer with 199 goals in major competitions.

Notable players

Players are listed according to the date of their first team début for the club. Appearances and goals are for competitive first-team matches in Scottish League, Scottish Cup, Scottish League Cup and European Competition only; minor competitions (i.e. the Aberdeenshire Cup) and wartime matches are excluded. Substitute appearances are included.

Positions key

Statistics correct as of match played on 19 March 2022

Notes

References 

 Aberdeen player stats at afcheritage.org
 

 
Aberdeen
Players
Association football player non-biographical articles
Players